Andreyevka 1-ya is a rural locality (a village) in Sukhogayovskoye Rural Settlement, Verkhnekhavsky District, Voronezh Oblast, Russia. The population was 72 as of 2010. There are 2 streets.

Geography 
Andreyevka 1-ya is located 13 km southwest of Verkhnyaya Khava (the district's administrative centre) by road. Sukhiye Gai is the nearest rural locality.

References 

Rural localities in Verkhnekhavsky District